The Sumatran slender gecko (Hemiphyllodactylus margarethae) is a species of gecko. It is endemic to Sumatra.

References

Hemiphyllodactylus
Endemic fauna of Indonesia
Reptiles of Indonesia
Fauna of Sumatra
Reptiles described in 1931
Taxa named by Leo Brongersma